The Abierto Victoria was a tournament for professional female tennis players played on outdoor hard courts. The event was classified as a $50,000 ITF Women's Circuit tournament and was held in Ciudad Victoria, Mexico, from 2012 to 2015.

Past finals

Singles

Doubles

External links 
 ITF search

ITF Women's World Tennis Tour
Hard court tennis tournaments
Tennis tournaments in Mexico
Abiert
Recurring sporting events established in 2012
Recurring sporting events disestablished in 2015
2012 establishments in Mexico
2015 disestablishments in Mexico